Wilfried Daim (July 21, 1923 in Vienna – December 2016 in Vienna) was an Austrian psychologist, psychotherapist, writer and art collector.

Between 1940 and 1945 Daim was active in the Catholic resistance in Austria. He founded the private Institute for Political Psychology in Vienna in 1956.

Daim published many books on the topic of psychology and faith, but he is most noted for his book Der Mann, der Hitler die Ideen gab ("The man, who gave Hitler the Ideas") which established the connection between Lanz von Liebenfels and Adolf Hitler. This book was first published in 1957, and received many editions and two revisions in German, but has never been translated into English.

Daim is also known as art collector.

References

External links
 Wilfried Daim entry in the catalogue of the German National Library.

1923 births
2016 deaths
Austrian male writers
Austrian psychologists
Germanic mysticism
Burials at Ottakring Cemetery

Austrian Roman Catholics